Historia: Zeitschrift für Alte Geschichte is a peer-reviewed academic journal specialising in Greek and Roman antiquity. It is published quarterly by Franz Steiner Verlag. It is ranked as an "A"-journal for "History" in the European Reference Index for the Humanities of the European Science Foundation, in the "Ranked Journal List" of the Australian Research Council, and in other journal rankings.

Since 1956, it is supplemented by a series of monographs, the renowned "Historia Einzelschriften".

References

External links 
 

Classics journals
Multilingual journals
Quarterly journals
Publications established in 1952